Jaylen Anthony Robinson (born January 25, 1995), known professionally as Rob Stone (stylized as Rob $tone), is an American rapper  from San Diego, California.

Early life
Jaylen Anthony Robinson was born on January 25, 1995, in San Diego, California. From a young age, he was influenced by his father’s vintage music collection, and expanded his listening to reggae, hip hop, rock, and R&B. He attended college in Atlanta, Georgia, where he first started teaching himself how to rap.

Career
Stone first released his first song "Chill Bill" on June 10, 2014, on his SoundCloud. He wrote the song in the back of a police car. Stone then went on to release his debut mixtape Straight Bummin on February 8, 2015. The music video for "Chill Bill" was released on June 25, 2015, on his friend's YouTube channel called "Twelve O'Seven". Stone then released the song as his debut single on June 17, 2016.  The song debuted at number 99 on the Billboard Hot 100, and peaked at number 29 on the chart. The official remix of the song features American rappers DRAM, Denzel Curry, and Cousin Stizz. In September 2016, Stone released his second mixtape I'm Almost Ready.

Discography

Studio albums
 Don't Wait for It (2017)
 Stone Cold (2020)

Mixtapes

Singles

As lead artist

References

External links
Rob Stone's SoundCloud
Rob Stone's Twitter
Rob Stone's Instagram
Rob Stone's YouTube

1995 births
Living people
African-American male rappers
Rappers from San Diego
People from Lemon Grove, California
West Coast hip hop musicians
African-American songwriters
Songwriters from California
21st-century American rappers
21st-century American male musicians
21st-century African-American musicians
American male songwriters